Lelio "Les" Marino (c. 1935 – November 12, 2004) was an American entrepreneur. Born in Chieti, Italy, he emigrated to the United States in 1958. He co-founded construction company Modern Continental in 1967 with business partner Kenneth Anderson, and grew it into a six billion-dollar group of companies with interests in restaurants, marinas, and transportation services in addition to the core construction business.

He died on November 12, 2004, as a result of an infarct.

References

Company Web site

1930s births
2004 deaths
People from Chieti
American construction businesspeople
Italian emigrants to the United States
20th-century American businesspeople